{{Infobox person
| name               = James L. DuBose
| image              =
| birth_date         = 
| birth_place        = Greensboro, North Carolina, U.S.
| education          = BA, communications
| alma_mater         = Wake Forest University
| years_active       = 1996–present
| employer           = Fox Soul
| notable_works      = One Mic Stand', Honor Up| television         = 
| title              = General manager / head of programming
| relatives          = Mary Ann DuBose (mother)
| awards             = Trailblazer, Sheen Magazine Awards
}}
James L. DuBose (born December 4, 1969) is an American television producer, filmmaker, and entertainment industry executive. He serves as General Manager / Head of Programming of FOX Soul for FOX Television Networks.

Early life and family
Born and raised in the city of Greensboro, North Carolina, James DuBose marked his coming of age experience in the South, during a turning point of the Civil Rights movement and throughout the pinnacle "desegregation and integration" era of Greensboro. James DuBose was raised by his mother, Mary Ann DuBose, a single parent who worked at the local AMP plant.

 Education 
Northeast Guilford High School, an educational institution located in McLeansville, North Carolina, is where James L. DuBose earned his high school diploma and gained notable recognition as an elite athlete. As a result, he attended Wake Forest University located in Winston-Salem, North Carolina on a full athletic football scholarship, with Communications as his focused major of study. On the sports side of his higher learning educational experience, DuBose was a major team player of WSU's college football roster, as a defensive end for the Wake Forest Demon Deacons. As a senior, he was co-captain of the 1989 Wake Forest Demon Deacons football team. On May 21, 1990, James L. DuBose was officiated as a member of the Wake Forest University Graduating Class of 1990, presented with a Bachelor of Communications.

 Football 
In 1990, James L. DuBose was drafted by the Detroit Lions during National Football League draft (NFL). Reports reveal that once his "dream of playing pro football ended," DuBose leveraged his broadcasting communications degree to ignite his  career as a television producer.

DuBose Entertainment
Before launching DuBose Entertainment, James DuBose served as President of Sean 'P. Diddy' Combs' Bad Boy Television under the Bad Boy Worldwide Entertainment brand. For his role of results, DuBose is credited for his executive eye in bringing the 'real' to reel, captivating audiences while generating top-billing numbers.

In 2006, DuBose founded DuBose Entertainment, seeing the Los Angeles production company to grow to house 45 employees just in its first few years of operation. Projects under his DuBose Entertainment banner include Comic View: One Mic Stand with Kevin Hart, Keyshia Cole: The Way It Is, Monica: Still Standing, Tiny and Toya, Toya: A Family Affair, Trey Songz: My Moment, The Michael Vick Project, and Hell Date.

Efforts to form a music branch under the DuBose Entertainment banner led DuBose to join forces with rapper MC Lyte. On August 27, 2009, MC Lyte took to her blog to announce the merger. "There is no doubt that James DuBose is a prolific producer of reality programming", she wrote. "Who has become the go to guy for some of today's biggest names." Two-years later, the pair signed dancehall reggae artist Beenie Man to the music label. That same year, R&B singer Tweet joined the growing artist roster of DuBose Music Group. In 2013, Tweet released a five-track EP, "Simply Tweet," under the DuBose brand.

 FOX Soul 
On January 13, 2020, James DuBose lead the official live-streamed launch of FOX Soul, a digital television network and streaming service operated by Fox Television Stations, audience-accessed through various digital streaming platforms including YouTube, YouTube TV, FOX Now, Samsung +, Roku, Tubi, Amazon Fire TV, The Web, Apple TV, Stirr, FuboTV, iOs, Android, Twitter, Facebook, Instagram.

In May 2021, with a reported 44-million count of viewers FOX Soul was green lit to expand its Black culture-fuelled programming In May 2021. With DuBose holding the seat of Head of Programming, the streaming service successfully entered into its second season. "The partnerships with black talent and creators that we have been able to forge to date, speaks volumes to how the community is feeling about us here at FOX SOUL," DuBose told PR and mainstream media outlets.

On September 30, 2022, Deadline Hollywood published word of FOX Soul's further expansion with a return of original FOX Soul flagship series on the network including The Black Report, The Book of Sean (hosted by Rev. Dr. Sean H. McMillian), The Business of Being Black with Tammi Mac, Cocktails with the Queens (co-hosted by Claudia Jordan, Vivica A. Fox, LisaRaye McCoy and Syleena Johnson), TEA G-I-F (co-hosted by Claudia Jordan, Al Reynolds and Funky Dineva aka Quentin Latham). "Fox Soul continues to expand on genres that we love, in a unique way. This fall, we are tapping further into music, sports and finance," said James DuBose, General Manager and Head of Programming. "Fox Soul will continue to provide programming that tells the story behind the stories as we remain resolute in our mission to entertain, educate and inspire."

Film
DuBose officiated his role as a film producer with the February 11, 2018 release of the Dame Dash-directed, one-hour and twenty-four-second Lionsgate film Honor Up''. According to the Los Angeles Times, "Damon Dash directed and stars in this crime drama about an OG trying to protect his family after a shootout in Harlem. Written by Stuart Acher and James DuBose; story by Damon Dash and Kevin Bennett."

Philanthropy 
DuBose is reported to have future plans to launch a television production camp for children of low-income families.

During the COVID-19 pandemic, The James DuBose Scholarship Program was created as a charitable resource for qualified candidates to gain financial assistance to post secondary study in the United States across multiple disciplines.

Awards and nominations 
On September 8, 2022, James DuBose was named a trailblazing figure during the SHEEN Magazine Awards show. In a press release, the Black PR Wire published word of the event held in Atlanta, Georgia. Hosted by Dish Nation commentator Headkrack, the awards show was streamed live from the Sheraton Hotel Atlanta over the FOX Soul streaming network.

Filmography

References

External links
 

1969 births
Living people
African-American film directors
African-American film producers
African-American television producers
Wake Forest Demon Deacons football players
Players of American football from Greensboro, North Carolina
Businesspeople from North Carolina
20th-century American businesspeople
21st-century American businesspeople